The Panther Type 400 is an automobile which was produced by Industria Sammarinese Costruzioni Automezzi of Milan, Italy circa 1956.

The Panther Type 400 was offered in two models: 
 Type 400 D, offered as a saloon powered by a 520cc 2 cylinder diesel engine.
 Type 400 B, offered as a 2-door saloon powered by a 520cc 2 cylinder petrol engine, and as a Pantherbus Station Wagon.

The Type 400 D saloon had an overall length of 3.56 metres and a wheelbase of 1.98 metres.

References

External links
 Panther 1954, www.classiccarcatalogue.com

Type 400
1950s cars